In Arabic and Maltese, the consonants are divided into two groups, called the sun letters or solar letters and moon letters or lunar letters (Arabic:), based on whether they assimilate the letter   of a preceding Arabic definite article al-, which is an important general rule used in Arabic grammar. Phonetically, sun letters are ones pronounced as coronal consonants, and moon letters are ones pronounced as other consonants.

This also applies to the Maltese language where they are written as ix-xemx and il-qamar.

Rule
For example, "the Nile" is pronounced , not .

When the Arabic definite article is followed by a moon letter, no assimilation takes place.

The sun letters represent the coronal consonants according to the phonology of Classical Arabic, and the moon letters represent all others. The sun and moon letters are as follows:

Hamza is not considered a letter.

Jīm
The letter   is pronounced differently depending on the region of the speaker. As a result, it was classified as a moon letter, and it does not assimilates the article in Classical Arabic. Maltese ġ  is also considered a moon consonant, whereas its voiceless counterpart ċ  is a sun consonant.

However, in some dialects of Moroccan Arabic and Palestinian Arabic,  (often //) assimilates, like a sun letter, e.g.,  (‘camel’).

Emphatic consonants 

Maltese 
The sun (konsonanti xemxin) and moon (konsonanti qamrin) letters are as follows:

If a word starts with any of the moon letters, the definite article il- stays the same and does not assimilate, while with the sun letters it assimilates accordingly to: iċ-, id-, in-, ir-, is-, it-, ix-, iż-, iz-. It is also worth mentioning that words starting with vowels, and the letters għ, and h get the definite article l- (minus the initial i). When the definite article comes exactly after a word ending in a vowel, the initial <i> of the article always drops, as in "dak ir-raġel ra r-raġel" (that man saw the man). When a word starts with two consonants, the definite article used is l-, but an i is attached at the beginning of the word: skola > l-iskola and Żvezja > l-Iżvezja.

Orthography

In the written language, the ⟨⟩  is retained regardless of how it is pronounced. When full diacritics are used, assimilation may be expressed by putting a  ⟨ ّ⟩ on the consonant after the  ⟨⟩.

Most modern-written Arabic names (including personal names and geographical Arabic names) do not follow the consonant assimilation rule or the shaddah when Latinized in Latin-spelled languages. Sometimes the sun and moon rules are not followed in casual speech. They are also mostly spaced rather than hyphenated.

E.g. personal name:
  - Al Rahman or El Rahman instead of Ar-Raḥmān
 geographical name:  - al-Jumhuriyah al-Tunisiyah instead of al-Jumhūrīyatu t-Tūnisīyah

|-
|
l
|
|
 
al-l...
|
 
al-lawn(u)
 
= the color

See also
Arabic phonology
Arabic grammar

References

Arabic language
Consonants
Phonology
Arabic phonology

ar:حروف شمسية وقمرية